Hirondina Joshua (b. Maputo, May 31, 1987), is a Mozambican poet and writer. Her name translates as swallow in Latin.

Books published

Individual works
 Os Ângulos da Casa. Preface Mia Couto. 2016. 1a. edição. Moçambique, ed. Fundação Fernando Leite Couto.
 Como Um Levita À Sombra dos Altares. Prefácio António Cabrita. 2021. Edições Húmus. Colecção 12Catorze (Conto). With illustrations by Newton Joaneth.
 A Estranheza Fora da Página. Co-authored with Ana Mafalda Leite. 2021. Edições Húmus. Colecção 12Catorze (Poetry). 
 Córtex. Preface Joana Bértholo. 2021. Editora Exclamação (Poetry).

Collective works
 2005. O Grasnar dos Corvos (Play). Co-authorship.
 2021. Português, Lugar de Escrita - Mulheres Na Poesia. Co-authorship. Organized by Casa Fernando Pessoa

Anthologies
Has participated in several national and foreign anthologies and texts published in Mozambican newspapers and magazines, Portugal, Angola, Galicia and Brazil.

2006. Esperança e Certeza I . Antologia.
2008. Esperança e Certeza II . Antologia.
2012. A Minha Maputo É... . Antologia. Moçambique, published by Minerva, pp. 45.
2014. Alquimia Del Fuego. Antologia. Espanha, published by Amargord Ediciones, pp. 481.
2020. Rio das Pérolas. Antologia. Macau, ed. Ipsis Verbis.
2022. Este imenso mar - Antologia de autores contemporâneos de língua portuguesa. Antologia. Portugal, ed. Camões, Instituto da Cooperação e da Língua, pp 53.
2022. Ecos de Moçambique - Um século de José Craveirinha. Author Lola Geraldes Xavier. ed. Blucher, pp. 249-250

Literary projects 
Curator of literary column (dissemination of texts and conversations with lusophone authors) Exercícios da Retina

Collaborations in magazines and newspapers 
Among which stands out the magazines Caliban, TriploV, Courier des Afriques.

And Palavra Comum, Pessoa, Modern Poetry in Translation magazines. She has participated in colloquia, Tertulia and debates on literature.

International Events 
 2019 - Participated in the 8th edition of the Macau Literary Festival (The Script Road - Macau Literary Festival).  
 2020 - Participated in the 21st edition of the Correntes d'Escritas Literary Festival in Portugal. 
 2022 - Participated in the XXXVII edition of the Barcelona International Poetry Festival in Spain. 
 2022 - Participated in the Lisbon Revisited 2022 - Days of Poetry.

Awards and Distinctions 
 2014 - Premio Mondiale di Poesia Nósside: received an honorable mention, offered by UNESCO's international poetry board, with the work Invenção.
 2022 - With the book Córtex, translated into Spanish and published in Mexico through the Translation and Editing Support Line (LATE) 2022, Camões L.P. and the Directorate-General of Books, Archives and Libraries (DGLAB) have set up a Bibliographic Fund for distribution by the Camões I.P. teaching networks.

References 

1987 births
Living people
Mozambican women writers